USS Samuel Chase (APA-26), launched as SS African Meteor, was an  manned by the United States Coast Guard during World War II. She was named after Founding Father Samuel Chase, a signatory to the Declaration of Independence. 
 
Samuel Chase participated in all five of the major U.S. amphibious invasions in the European Theater of Operations during World War II, starting at Algiers in late 1942 and following with the invasions of Sicily, Salerno, Normandy, and Southern France before going to the Pacific in 1945.  There she stood duty at Okinawa, under frequent air attack in the aftermath of its invasion, before participating in delivering occupation troops to Japan and repatriating U.S. troops through the middle of 1946.

She was decommissioned in February 1947, laid up in the James River near Fort Eustis, Virginia, struck from the Navy register in October 1958, and transferred to Maritime Administration in February 1959. She remained in the James River Reserve Fleet until sold for scrap in May 1973.

Construction 
The ship was laid down under Maritime Commission contract (MC hull 107) on 31 August 1940 as a Maritime Commission type (C3-P&C) hull at Ingalls Shipbuilding, Pascagoula, Mississippi.

African Meteor, Maritime Commission hull 107, yard hull 266, was launched on 23 August 1941; sponsored by Mrs. Theresa Murray; completed 6 February 1942 and delivered to the War Shipping Administration. The Navy purchased the vessel the same day. The ship was commissioned as USS Samuel Chase (AP-56) on 13 June 1942.

Operations
Samuel Chase sailed from Hampton Roads on 18 September 1942. The first stop was Halifax, Nova Scotia, Canada to join up with a large convoy and arrived at Belfast, Northern Ireland, with a troop convoy on 6 October. On 26 October, she sailed from Greenock, Scotland, as flagship for the landings at Algiers, part of the Allied invasion of North Africa. En route, she was narrowly missed by a torpedo in the same attack that disabled the attack transport, . This was her first of several close brushes with disaster under persistent enemy air and submarine attack in the Mediterranean.

Operation Torch
The goal of Operation Torch was the capture of the major airfields and ports of North Africa to allow the allies to continue operations from the ground, from the air and from sea. This was to be accomplished within 24 hours in a three-pronged assault commencing on 8 November 1942: an expedition to Morocco and landings in Algeria. While the landings were taking place off Morocco Samuel Chase, under the command of Commander Roger C. Heimer (USCG), landed the first troops just east of Algiers shortly after midnight. Samuel Chase remained off the beach for three days before entering the harbor of Algiers. While lying off Algiers, the expedition's transports were attacked daily first by bombers and then by torpedo planes. German Junkers Ju 88s came in with torpedoes; one passed under Samuel Chases anchor chain and hit a Navy transport astern taking out her rudder and screws. The Chase's gun crews shot down two Ju 88s after they dropped their torpedoes, banked, and came down its starboard side about 100 feet away. Both of the aircraft crashed on the beach.

The landing craft maintained their runs to the beach despite the attacks. The immense size of Samuel Chase made her look formidable to the attacking aircraft and thus she received a disproportional amount of the enemy's attention. The crewmen of the Coast Guard-manned transport were commended by the British for their anti-aircraft defense and were credited with shooting down three planes. So intense was the fire that the British nicknamed Samuel Chase the "Battleship". The transport sailed on 12 November with a convoy to the United Kingdom to pick up reinforcements, which were disembarked at Algiers on 6 December. Samuel Chase then sailed on 31 December for overhaul in the United States, arriving at Norfolk on 12 January 1943.

She was reclassified as an Attack Transport (APA-26) effective 1 February 1943. At that time, the quad mount 1.1-inch guns were replaced with dual 40 mm guns. Operation Torch proved to be the turning point in the Allies' war against Germany. After the loss of French Morocco, Germany remained on the defensive for the rest of the war. The capture of North Africa allowed the Allies to begin to plan and prepare for the assault on Sicily where once again Samuel Chase would play a significant role. Samuel Chase sailed from the United States on 5 March and disembarked troops at Oran on 19 March. During April, her boat crews underwent training on Algerian beaches and were joined by their ship on 24 May for additional training with the ship's full contingent of troops.

LCDR James W. Paine, USCG received the Bronze Star for heroic achievement as Gunnery Officer of USS Samuel Chase during the amphibious landings at North Africa 8 November through 14 November 1942. By his marked ability and untiring efforts in developing his inexperienced gun crews into a well functioning unit, he maintained an effective defense of his ship against repeated raids by German aircraft, skillfully controlling the fire of Samuel Chase with the result that one enemy plane was shot down and two others probably destroyed.

Operation Husky
Operation Husky, the Allied Invasion of Sicily, involved some 1,400 other ships and over 1,800 landing craft putting ashore nearly one-half million men. It was a daring plan to send so many men ashore in the initial landings; it had never been tried before and has not been done on this scale since, even at Normandy on D-Day in 1944. For the initial assault on Gela, Samuel Chase lowered twenty-one boats of troops from the United States Seventh Army. The first three waves came under fire but the "Lucky Chase" did not lose a man. This was attributed to the Coast Guard's ability to handle small boats and the fact that the landings were actually performed better than those made during the practices. While German planes buzzed overhead the amphibious craft brought supplies to the beach at a staggering rate. The heavy equipment bogged down on the beach due to the soft sand. Supplies began to pile up as more and more craft brought supplies to the beach. Aggravating this problem was the absence of the Army unloading details that were frequently called into action. Without the unloading details available the Coast Guard and Navy crews unloaded the craft themselves. Despite these hindrances, the men from Samuel Chase, for example, made over 250 trips to the beach to land the transport's cargo.

Samuel Chase retired from the beachhead for Algiers with wounded personnel on 12 July. On 9 August, she embarked new troops for amphibious training.

Operation Avalanche
The objective of Operation Avalanche was to land enough troops in the Gulf of Salerno on the mainland of Italy on 9 September 1943 to establish a bridgehead, capture Naples and secure the airfields in the area. Samuel Chase, served as the flagship of Admiral John L. Hall, commander of the Southern Attack Force. It had on board Lt. General Fred L. Walker, 96 officers, and 1163 enlisted men of the VI Corps, 36th and 45th Infantry Divisions. Samuel Chases landing craft disembarked the troops while light artillery shelled the beach. After the men landed, the craft made the fifteen-mile trip to the beach time after time to unload Samuel Chases 88 vehicles, 13 2-ton trucks, four half tracks, 251 tons of ammunition, 125 tons of rations, water and engineer's supplies, 44 tons of gasoline and 2 tons of pyrotechnics. Samuel Chase had a brush with disaster. The attack transport had weighed anchor and was proceeding through the mine-swept channel when the medium and high altitude bombers struck. Six bombs fell close aboard the transport. Two large bombs fell close enough to splash water on the forecastle and jar the ship but did no serious damage. She departed Salerno a day later; and, after training French troops in landing techniques near Algiers between 22 October and 2 November, returned to the United States on 25 November for repairs.

Captain Roger C. Heimer, USCG received the Legion of Merit and the Gold Star in lieu of the second Legion of Merit for outstanding services as commanding officer of Samuel Chase during the amphibious assault on Sicily from 10 to 12 July 1943. Chief Boatswain's Mate William G. Lawrence, USCGR received the Silver Star for gallantry in action while attached to Samuel Chase during the amphibious invasion of the Island of Sicily on 10 July 1943, and of the Italian mainland on 9 September 1943.

Lt Roger H. Banner USCG, received the Legion of Merit for exceptionally meritorious conduct as Officer in Charge of a support boat from Samuel Chase during the invasion of Italy 9 September 1943. Courageous and skillful in executing a hazardous task he successfully escorted 59 amphibious trucks to the beaches under cover of night and directed unloading of artillery and equipment. Navigating by stars he continued to traverse the distance of 12 miles between off-shore anchorage and the beaches, continuously exposed to the danger of minefields and shell and mortar fire.

CDR James S. Hunt, USCGR received the Silver Star for conspicuous gallantry in action while serving as Boat Group Commander of the Assault Craft attached to Samuel Chase during the amphibious invasion of Italy 9 September 1943. Successfully leading his assault boat crews to the assigned beaches in the Gulf of Salerno, Commander (then LCDR) Hunt expedited the landing of embarked troops and equipment in the face of tremendous enemy opposition. Making an extended reconnaissance in an assault boat beyond the established beaches and under heavy enemy artillery fire on 10 September, he obtained valuable information which assisted greatly in the effective employment of assaulting forces against strongly defended enemy positions.

After completion of repairs on 26 December, Samuel Chase conducted amphibious training on the east coast until departing Norfolk on 12 February 1944 for Glasgow, Scotland, where she arrived on 22 February to prepare for the invasion of Hitler's "Fortress Europe."

Operation Neptune
Operation Neptune was the code name for Operation Overlord's amphibious assault and naval gunfire support operations.  These were divided between two task forces that would get the troops from ports all over Great Britain and land them on the beaches of Normandy, keep them supplied, and give them fire support. The U.S. Coast Guard was an integral part of Operation Neptune. The service's presence centered around Assault Group "O-1" that landed troops of the First Division, the "Big Red One," on the easternmost beaches of the Omaha assault area. The two sections of the five-mile-long beachhead code-named "Omaha" were "Easy Red" and "Fox Green" beaches. Samuel Chase supported "Easy Red" beach.

Commanded by Coast Guard Captain Edward H. Fritzsche, this assault group consisted of Samuel Chase, the United States Navy's , the British Ministry of War Transport Landing Ship, Infantry (Large) , six LCI(L)s, six LSTs, and 97 smaller craft. Samuel Chase, accompanying attack transports and LSTs of Assault Group O-1, sailed from England and were joined by five LCI(L)s from Flotilla 10 and ten craft from the Matchbox Fleet. All safely arrived in the transport area, and Samuel Chases anchor dropped into the channel at 3:15 am All was quiet on Samuel Chase when the order to "lower away" was given at 5:30 am All that could be heard was the squeaking of the davits and the quiet whispers of the soldiers as they loaded into the LCVPs.  The landing craft were lowered into the swells and headed towards France.  Here too, as at Utah, they were well away from the coast and subjected to the unsheltered waters of the Channel.  All of the Chase's boats got away without incident but seasickness soon overtook most of the soldiers.  They had to go through 11 miles of rough seas, strong currents, and minefields.  They soon passed the battleships on their journey in and the soldiers winced as the 14-inch guns fired.  Ernest Hemingway, author, in one of the LCVPs, later wrote about the men, "Under their steel helmets they looked like pikemen of the Middle Ages to whose aid in battle had suddenly come some strange and unbelievable monster." Samuel Chase launched 15 assault waves and by 11 am all of the 1st Division troops aboard had disembarked. LCTs maneuvered alongside and soon all of their equipment was on the way to the beaches as well. The LCVPs and LCMs returned with casualties who were cared for by the Chase's U.S. Navy and Public Health Service doctors and corpsmen. Chase returned to Weymouth, England, on 7 June.

Motor Machinist's Mate, Second Class Frank W. Freeman, USCG received the Bronze Star for extreme devotion to duty and courageous activity which served to inspire others during the initial attack on France 6 June 1944 while serving aboard Samuel Chase. Freeman was wounded and his boat driven off by severe fire. When the call for LCVPs to unload LCIs was issued he went immediately to his boat and despite mental and physical handicap of his wound, he again went into the beach not returning until the task was completed.

LT Harold J. Mackway, USCG Reserve received a Commendation for meritorious performance of duty and courage under fire as Wave Commander in the initial attack near Colleville, Bay of the Seine on 6 June 1944 CG 36149, Serial 0117, issued 6 July 1944.

LTJG Edward R. Tharp, USCG received the Bronze Star for meritorious performance as Assistant Boat group Commander aboard Samuel Chase during the assault on France on 6 June 1944.  Despite enemy gunfire, he closed the beach many times in order to provide the Group Commander with valuable data for carrying out the assault.

Operation Dragoon
Samuel Chase sailed on 4 July 1944 for the Mediterranean to participate in Operation Dragoon, the assault on Southern France. After embarking troops at Naples on 16 July, it landed them in the Bay of Pampelonne on 15 August. She then made several voyages in the Mediterranean transporting French personnel from Italy and Algeria to ports in Southern France before sailing from Oran on 25 October for overhaul at Boston, Mass., where she arrived on 8 November.

Pacific operations
Ordered to the Pacific Fleet, Samuel Chase departed Boston on 15 January 1945 and reached Pearl Harbor on 6 February and arrived at Leyte, Philippine Islands, on 4 March. She began amphibious training on 14 March, but struck a shoal during training two days later. The transport sailed again on 19 June for the western Pacific; and, after brief stops en route, arrived off Okinawa on 24 July. She remained off the beach there under frequent enemy air attacks which followed the Battle of Okinawa until sailing for Ulithi on 10 August.

After the Japanese surrender on VJ-Day, 15 August 1945, Samuel Chase sailed to San Pedro Bay in the Philippines, embarked occupation troops there between 26 August and 2 September, and delivered them to Yokohama, Japan, on 8 September. She then returned to the Philippines for more troops, whom she disembarked on Hokkaido on 5 October. Returning to the Philippines, she embarked personnel of a Seabee battalion, which she landed at Tsingtao, China, on 1 November. Reporting for "Operation Magic Carpet" duty on 15 November, the transport sailed from Tsingtao on 19 November and delivered a full load of homeward-bound troops at San Diego on 11 December. Coming under the control of the Naval Transportation Service, she made three more voyages to the western Pacific in the next six months, touching at Okinawa, Hong Kong, Yokosuka, Siapan, Guam, Peleliu, and Majuro. At least one of these voyages (6 April to 15 May 1946, round trip from San Francisco) was dubbed the "Diaper Brigade" by some of the sailors on board as dependants of occupation troops were carried to join their families.

Deactivation
The ship arrived at Norfolk, Virginia on 21 July 1946 for inactivation, was decommissioned there on 26 February 1947, and was laid up in the James River. The transport was struck from the Navy list on 1 October 1958 and transferred to Maritime Administration custody on 11 February 1959. She remained in the James River Reserve Fleet until 10 August 1973 when delivered to the Consolidated Steel Corp. of Brownsville, Texas after being sold for scrap for $116,660 on 9 May 1973.

Awards
Samuel Chase received 5 battle stars for her World War II service. North Africa, Sicily, Anzio, Normandy and Pampelonne.

 Combat Action Ribbon (2 awards – retroactive for North Africa and Okinawa)
 American Campaign Medal 
 European–African–Middle Eastern Campaign Medal 4 battle stars
 Asiatic–Pacific Campaign Medal with 1 battle star
 World War II Victory Medal
 Navy Occupation Medal with "ASIA" clasp
 China Service Medal
 Philippine Liberation Medal

References

 Omaha Beach – Force O – Americain D-Day.
 APA-26 Samuel Chase – Navsource Online (photographic record).
 APA/LPA (Attack Transports) – US Navy History website (DANFS)
 The Battle for Fox Green Beach, D-Day Normandy.
 "D-Day" Landings on "Omaha" Beach – US Navy History website.
 Nine wonderful years in the Coast Guard – Unofficial Coast Guard website.

 

Arthur Middleton-class attack transports
Ships built in Pascagoula, Mississippi
1941 ships
World War II auxiliary ships of the United States
World War II amphibious warfare vessels of the United States
Ships named for Founding Fathers of the United States